Beginning in 1988, there have been many comic books published as part of the Terminator franchise from a variety of publishers, but mostly by Dark Horse Comics.

NOW Comics

The Terminator (1988–1990)
 (September 1988)
 (October 1988)
If I Had A Rocket Launcher... (November 1988)
Amahiri (December 1988)
The Bee Stings (February 1989)
Goin' Back To Miami (March 1989)
Big Bad Wolf: A Dog Bites Man Story. (April 1989)
In the Belly of the Beast (May 1989)
 (June 1989)
 (July 1989)
Factories (August 1989)
Night-Convoy (September 1989)
 (October 1989 )
Into the Deep Blue Sea (November 1989)
See Cuba and Die! (December 1989)
The Battle of Cuba (January 1990)
Escape to Silver Dollar (February 1990)

Terminator: The Burning Earth (1990 / 1990)
 (March 1990)
 (April 1990)
 (May 1990)
 (June 1990)
 (July 1990)
TPB Terminator: The Burning Earth (March 1990)

The Terminator: All My Futures Past (1990)
 (August 1990)
 (September 1990)

Dark Horse Comics

The Terminator: Tempest (1990 / 1991)
Tempest Pt. 1 (August 1990)
Tempest Pt. 2 (September 1990)
Tempest Pt. 3 (October 1990)
Tempest Pt. 4 (November 1990)
TPB The Terminator: Tempest (September 1991)
HC The Terminator: Tempest (September 1991)

The Terminator: One Shot (1991)
 (July 1991)

The Terminator: Secondary Objectives (1991 / 1992)
 (July 1991)
 (August 1991)
 (September 1991)
 (October 1991)
TPB The Terminator: Secondary Objectives (March 1992)

The Terminator: The Enemy Within (1991–1992 / 1992)
 (November 1991)
 (December 1991)
 (January 1992)
 (February 1992)
TPB The Terminator: The Enemy Within (November 1992)

The Terminator: Hunters and Killers (1992 / 1992)
 (March 1992)
 (April 1992)
 (May 1992)
TPB The Terminator: Hunters and Killers Diamond Star System Exclusive (1992)

The Terminator: Endgame (1992 / 1999)
 (September 1992)
 (October 1992)
 (October 1992)
TPB The Terminator: Endgame (January 1999)

RoboCop Versus The Terminator (1992 / 1992)
 (September 1992)
(Platinum Edition) (September 1992)
 (October 1992)
 (November 1992)
 (December 1992)
TPB RoboCop Versus The Terminator (1992)

The Terminator: Death Valley (1998)
Special (August 1998)	
 (September 1998)
 (October 1998)
 (November 1998)
 (December 1998)

The Terminator: The Dark Years (1999)
 (August 1999)
 (October 1999)
 (November 1999)
 (December 1999)

Superman versus The Terminator: Death to the Future (1999–2000 / 2000)
 (December 1999)
 (January 2000)
 (February 2000)
 (March 2000)
TPB Superman vs. The Terminator: Death to the Future (November 2000)

Aliens versus Predator versus The Terminator (2000 / 2001)
 (April 2000)
 (May 2000)
 (June 2000)
 (July 2000)
TPB Aliens versus Predator versus The Terminator (March 2001)

The Terminator: Omnibus (2008)
Vol. 01 (February 2008)
Vol. 02 (March 2008)

The Terminator 2029 (2010)
 (March 2010)
 (April 2010)
 (May 2010)

The Terminator 1984 (2010)
 (September 2010)
 (October 2010)
 (November 2010)

Terminator Salvation: The Final Battle (2013–2014 / 2014–2015)
 (December 2013)
 (January 2014)
 (February 2014)
 (March 2014)
 (April 2014)
 (May 2014)
 (June 2014)
 (July 2014)
 (August 2014)
 (September 2014)
 (October 2014)
 (November 2014)
TPB #1 Terminator Salvation: The Final Battle (November 2014)
TPB #2 Terminator Salvation: The Final Battle (April 2015)

The Terminator: Enemy of My Enemy (2014 / 2015)
 (February 2014)
 (March 2014)
 (May 2014)
 (July 2014)
 (September 2014)
 (October 2014)
TPB The Terminator: Enemy of my Enemy (February 2015)

Terminator: Sector War (2018 / 2019)
 (August 2018)
 (September 2018)
 (February 2019)
 (May 2019)
TPB Terminator: Sector War (August 2019)

Terminator: Resistance (2019)
 (November 2019)

Marvel Comics

Terminator 2: Judgment Day (1991)
 Arrival (Early September 1991)
 Escape (Late September 1991)
 Departure (October 1991)
TPB Terminator 2: Judgment Day (1991)

Norma Editorial

Terminator (1991–1992)
Spanish translation of The Terminator: Tempest

 (October 1991)
 (November 1991)
 (December 1991)
 (January 1992)

Terminator: Objetivos Secundarios (1992–1993)
Spanish translation of The Terminator: Secondary Objectives

 (October 1992)
 (November 1992)
 (December 1992)
 (January 1993)

Terminator: Enemigo Interno (1993)
Spanish translation of The Terminator: The Enemy Within

 (February 1993)
 (March 1993)
 (April 1993)
 (May 1993)

Malibu Comics

Terminator 2: Cybernetic Dawn (1995–1996)
 Lost & Found (November 1995)
 Search Mode (December 1995)
 Judgement Impaired (January 1996)
 Genesis & Revelations (February 1996)

Terminator 2: Nuclear Twilight (1995–1996)
 Warchild (November 1995)
 Suicide Mission (December 1995)
 Dead Men Walking (January 1996)
 Father's Day (February 1996)

Terminator 2: Nuclear Twilight/Cybernetic Dawn (1996)
 The Programming of Fate (April 1996)

Beckett Comics

Terminator 3 (2003)
 Before the Rise (July 2003)
 Before the Rise (August 2003)
 Eyes of the Rise (September 2003)
 Eyes of the Rise (October 2003)
 Fragmented (December 2003)
 Fragmented (December 2003)

Apple Books

Terminator 2: Judgment Day (2003)
TPB Terminator 2: Judgment Day - The Graphic Novel (October 2003)

Dynamite Entertainment

Terminator: Infinity (2007 / 2008)
 (July 2007)
(Cover B: Stjepan Šejić) (July 2007)
(Cover C: Nigel Raynor) (July 2007)
 (August 2007)
(Cover B: Stjepan Sejic) (August 2007)
(Cover C: Nigel Raynor) (August 2007)
 (September 2007)
(Cover B: Stjepan Sejic) (September 2007)
(Cover C: Nigel Raynor) (September 2007)
 (October 2007)
(Cover B) (October 2007)
(Cover C) (October 2007)
 (November 2007)
(Cover B) (November 2007)
(Cover C) (November 2007)
TPB Terminator: Infinity Vol. 01 (July 2008)

Terminator 2 (2008)

 Time To Kill, Episode Two of Four (January 2008)
(Cover B: 50% Painkiller Jane Cover) (January 2008)
 Time To Kill, Episode Four of Four (March 2008)
(Cover B) (March 2008)

Terminator: Revolution (2009)
 (January 2009)
 (February 2009)
(Cover B) (February 2009)
 (February 2009)
 (April 2009)
 (May 2009)

Terminator/RoboCop: Kill Human (2011)

After being activated by the last human on Earth, RoboCop tries to prevent the annihilation of humanity by time-traveling into the past.

The story consists of four issues.

IDW Publishing

Terminator Salvation: Movie Prequel (2009)

 Sand in the Gears (February 2009)
(Incentive Variant) (February 2009)
 Sand in the Gears, Part 2 (February 2009)
(Retailer Incentive Variant Cover Edition) (March 2009)
 Sand in the Gears, Part 3 (March 2009)
(Retailer Incentive Variant Cover Edition) (March 2009)
 Sand in the Gears, Part 4 (March 2009)

All four parts of the movie prequel were re-printed in the UK comic Terminator Salvation Comic, published by Titan Magazines.

Terminator Salvation: Movie Preview (2009)

0. Movie Preview (April 2009)

Transformers vs. The Terminator (2020)
A series of comics, Transformers vs. The Terminator, was published in 2020.

References

External links

Terminator query  at the Comic Book DB

 
Terminator